Katunje is a village development committee in Okhaldhunga District in the Sagarmatha Zone of mid-eastern Nepal. At the time of the 1991 Nepal census, it had a population of 4027 living in 824 individual households.

One of the major weekly markets of Okhaldhunga, Kosh Haat lies in Katunje VDC. Presently Katunje lies in Sunkoshi Rural Municipality within Okhaldhunga.

References

External links
UN map of the municipalities of Okhaldhunga District

Populated places in Okhaldhunga District